Photo Finish (novel) is a detective novel by Ngaio Marsh; it is the thirty-first, and penultimate, novel to feature Roderick Alleyn, and was first published in 1980.  Set in a millionaire's island mansion on a lake in New Zealand's South Island, it is the last of Ngaio Marsh's four New Zealand set novels - the others being Vintage Murder (1937), Colour Scheme (1943) and Died in the Wool (1945).

Plot summary

Inspector Alleyn and his wife, the painter Agatha Troy, are invited to the luxury home of millionaire Montague V Reece, newly built on a lake in New Zealand's South Island for his mistress, the international opera star Isabella Sommita. Alleyn's commission is to investigate and stop the activities of a masked paparazzo who has been persecuting Sommita with unauthorised, unflattering photos published under the name of 'Strix'. Troy is commissioned to paint the diva's portrait. An extended house party gathers for the world premiere of a new opera 'The Alien Corn' (based on the biblical Ruth story and featuring La Sommita's famous high note A 'in alt'), composed by a Byronically handsome young composer scooped up as her latest lover by the formidable Sommita, who lacks the judgement and taste to see that the opera is no good. "Corn is right", as her longtime vocal coach Signor Lattienzo comments. The premiere is an embarrassing fiasco and La Sommita is found dead in her bedroom, stabbed through the heart with a photo of herself impaled on the dagger.

Background and commentary

The theme of artistic integrity, the abusive behaviour of a temperamental but talented star performer and her devoted but long-suffering entourage echoes Marsh's 1960 novel False Scent, with La Sommita the latest in a long line of fictional artists, theatricals, stars or divas in Marsh novels whose behaviour is arrogant, egotistical or insufferable, and who are sadly liable to become victims of homicide. The character of La Sommita's protector, the Italian-American Montague V Reece, is the third of the exotic, plutocratic multi-millionaires who feature in Marsh's later novels (following Vassily Conducis in Death at the Dolphin and Nikolas Markos in Grave Mistake).

Marsh biographer Joanne Drayton quotes TV presenter Max Cryer reporting that Marsh told him in an interview at the time of the novel's publication, that the character of Isabella Sommita was inspired by Maria Callas, an identification that is readily understood.

References

Roderick Alleyn novels
1980 British novels
Novels set in New Zealand
Collins Crime Club books